Pakur railway station (code:PKR) is an important station of Pakur district, located in Pakur, Jharkhand, India. There is a General and a First Class Waiting Room for the passengers. The railway line on the western side leads to a freight yard, which consists of BOXNHL and BOBYN freight rakes. A rail loco shed is also available at the freight yard.

Trains
Major Trains available from this railway station are as follows:
 Sealdah-Alipurduar Kanchan Kanya Express
 Sealdah-Bamanhat Uttar Banga Express
 Sealdah–Silchar Kanchenjunga Express
 Sealdah–Agartala Kanchenjunga Express
 Sealdah - Malda Town Gour Express
 Mumbai-Kamakhya Karmabhoomi Express
 Tiruvananthapuram-Silchar Aronai Superfast Express
 Silchar- Coimbatore Superfast Express
 Silghat Town-Tambaram Nagaon Express
 Dibrugarh–Tambaram Superfast Express
 Ranchi–Kamakhya Express
 Puri Kamakhya Express
 Howrah–Jamalpur Express
 Howrah–Gaya Express
 Kolkata–Jogbani Express
 Surat–Malda Town Express
 Ranchi Bhagalpur Vananchal Express
 Digha–Malda Town Express
 Kolkata-Balurghat Tebhaga Express
 Kolkata–Haldibari Intercity Express
 Howrah-Radhikapur Kulik Express
 Yesvantpur–Muzaffarpur Weekly Express

Electrification
The station is electrified. The electrification of this section was sanctioned in the rail budget 2012–13. Both the platforms are connected via two railway foot overbridges (FOBs). Some of the passenger and freight train is currently using the ELocos.

References 

Railway stations in Pakur district
Howrah railway division